Institut Jules Bordet is a specialised general hospital (with in part university beds) and research institute of the Université libre de Bruxelles (ULB) specialising in oncology. It is located in Brussels, Belgium, and is the only accredited OECI-designated comprehensive cancer centre in Belgium.

The institute is named after Jules Bordet (1870–1961), an immunologist and microbiologist who won the Nobel Prize in Physiology or Medicine in 1919 for his discoveries relating to immunity.

The hospital is located nearby the academic Erasmus Hospital in Anderlecht since November 2021.

List of notable people
 Dominique Bron, baroness, Head of hematology
 Albert Claude, Director 1949-1970
 Marc Lacroix (biochemist), Breast cancer researcher
 Martine Piccart, baroness, Head of chemotherapy
 Francoise Meunier, baroness, former IJB staff member and EORTC general director

References

External links
 Institut Jules Bordet
 Laboratoire J.-C. Heuson de cancérologie mammaire 
 Origin of the Bordet Institute (from 1822 to 1934) 

Hospitals in Belgium
Research institutes in Belgium
Hospitals established in 1822
Buildings and structures in Brussels
Medical and health organisations based in Belgium